Dyschirius arcifer is a species of ground beetle in the subfamily Scaritinae. It was described by Znojko in 1928.

References

arcifer
Beetles described in 1928